Hans Daniels (born 11 December 1934) is a German politician of the Christian Democratic Union (CDU) and former member of the German Bundestag.

Life 
Daniels joined the CDU in 1955. He was chairman of the Junge Union in Bonn in 1957/58 and has been a member of the Rhineland CDU state executive committee since 1971. He was a member of the North Rhine-Westphalian state parliament from 26 July 1970 to 30 March 1983 and was chairman of the committee for local politics there from 1980 to 1983.

He was a member of the German Bundestag from 29 March 1983 to 20 December 1990. In Parliament he represented the constituency of Bonn.

Literature

References

1934 births
Members of the Bundestag for North Rhine-Westphalia
Members of the Bundestag 1987–1990
Members of the Bundestag 1983–1987
Members of the Bundestag for the Christian Democratic Union of Germany
Members of the Landtag of North Rhine-Westphalia
Living people